Early Daze: The Studio Collection is a compilation album by the Sex Pistols released in 1993.

Track listing
I Wanna Be Me
No Feelings
Anarchy in the U.K.
Satellite
Seventeen
Submission
Pretty Vacant
God Save the Queen
Liar
EMI
New York
Problems

Sex Pistols compilation albums
1993 compilation albums